Arthritis is a term often used to mean any disorder that affects joints. Symptoms generally include joint pain and stiffness. Other symptoms may include redness, warmth, swelling, and decreased range of motion of the affected joints. In some types of arthritis, other organs are also affected. Onset can be gradual or sudden.

There are over 100 types of arthritis. The most common forms are osteoarthritis (degenerative joint disease) and rheumatoid arthritis. Osteoarthritis usually occurs with age and affects the fingers, knees, and hips. Rheumatoid arthritis is an autoimmune disorder that often affects the hands and feet. Other types include gout, lupus, fibromyalgia, and septic arthritis. They are all types of rheumatic disease.

Treatment may include resting the joint and alternating between applying ice and heat. Weight loss and exercise may also be useful. Recommended medications may depend on the form of arthritis. These may include pain medications such as ibuprofen and paracetamol (acetaminophen). In some circumstances, a joint replacement may be useful.

Osteoarthritis affects more than 3.8% of people, while rheumatoid arthritis affects about 0.24% of people. Gout affects about 1–2% of the Western population at some point in their lives. In Australia about 15% of people are affected by arthritis, while in the United States more than 20% have a type of arthritis. Overall the disease becomes more common with age. Arthritis is a common reason that people miss work and can result in a decreased quality of life. The term is derived from arthr- (meaning 'joint') and -itis (meaning 'inflammation').

Classification
There are several diseases where joint pain is primary, and is considered the main feature. Generally when a person has "arthritis" it means that they have one of these diseases, which include:
 Osteoarthritis
 Rheumatoid arthritis
 Gout and pseudo-gout
 Septic arthritis
 Ankylosing spondylitis
 Juvenile idiopathic arthritis
 Still's disease
 Psoriatic arthritis

Joint pain can also be a symptom of other diseases. In this case, the arthritis is considered to be secondary to the main disease; these include:
 Psoriasis
 Reactive arthritis
 Ehlers–Danlos syndrome
 Iron overload
 Hepatitis
 Lyme disease
 Sjögren's disease
 Hashimoto's thyroiditis
 Celiac disease
 Non-celiac gluten sensitivity
 Inflammatory bowel disease (including Crohn's disease and ulcerative colitis)
 Henoch–Schönlein purpura
 Hyperimmunoglobulinemia D with recurrent fever
 Sarcoidosis
 Whipple's disease
 TNF receptor associated periodic syndrome
 Granulomatosis with polyangiitis (and many other vasculitis syndromes)
 Familial Mediterranean fever
 Systemic lupus erythematosus

An undifferentiated arthritis is an arthritis that does not fit into well-known clinical disease categories, possibly being an early stage of a definite rheumatic disease.

Signs and symptoms

Pain, which can vary in severity, is a common symptom in virtually all types of arthritis. Other symptoms include swelling, joint stiffness, redness, and aching around the joint(s). Arthritic disorders like lupus and rheumatoid arthritis can affect other organs in the body, leading to a variety of symptoms. Symptoms may include:
 Inability to use the hand or walk
 Stiffness in one or more joints
 Rash or itch
 Malaise and fatigue
 Weight loss
 Poor sleep
 Muscle aches and pains
 Tenderness
 Difficulty moving the joint

It is common in advanced arthritis for significant secondary changes to occur. For example, arthritic symptoms might make it difficult for a person to move around and/or exercise, which can lead to secondary effects, such as:

 Muscle weakness
 Loss of flexibility
 Decreased aerobic fitness
These changes, in addition to the primary symptoms, can have a huge impact on quality of life.

Disability

Arthritis is the most common cause of disability in the United States. More than 20 million individuals with arthritis have severe limitations in function on a daily basis. Absenteeism and frequent visits to the physician are common in individuals who have arthritis. Arthritis can make it difficult for individuals to be physically active and some become home bound.
It is estimated that the total cost of arthritis cases is close to $100 billion of which almost 50% is from lost earnings. Each year, arthritis results in nearly 1 million hospitalizations and close to 45 million outpatient visits to health care centers.

Decreased mobility, in combination with the above symptoms, can make it difficult for an individual to remain physically active, contributing to an increased risk of obesity, high cholesterol or vulnerability to heart disease. People with arthritis are also at increased risk of depression, which may be a response to numerous factors, including fear of worsening symptoms.

Risk factors
There are common risk factors that increase a person's chance of developing arthritis later in adulthood. Some of these are modifiable while others are not. Smoking has been linked to an increased susceptibility of developing arthritis, particularly rheumatoid arthritis.

Diagnosis
Diagnosis is made by clinical examination from an appropriate health professional, and may be supported by other tests such as radiology and blood tests, depending on the type of suspected arthritis. All arthritides potentially feature pain. Pain patterns may differ depending on the arthritides and the location. Rheumatoid arthritis is generally worse in the morning and associated with stiffness lasting over 30 minutes. However, in the early stages, patients may have no symptoms after a warm shower. Osteoarthritis, on the other hand, tends to be associated with morning stiffness which eases relatively quickly with movement and exercise. In the aged and children, pain might not be the main presenting feature; the aged patient simply moves less, the infantile patient refuses to use the affected limb.

Elements of the history of the disorder guide diagnosis. Important features are speed and time of onset, pattern of joint involvement, symmetry of symptoms, early morning stiffness, tenderness, gelling or locking with inactivity, aggravating and relieving factors, and other systemic symptoms. Physical examination may confirm the diagnosis or may indicate systemic disease. Radiographs are often used to follow progression or help assess severity.

Blood tests and X-rays of the affected joints often are performed to make the diagnosis. Screening blood tests are indicated if certain arthritides are suspected. These might include: rheumatoid factor, antinuclear factor (ANF), extractable nuclear antigen, and specific antibodies.

Osteoarthritis

Osteoarthritis is the most common form of arthritis. It affects humans and other animals, notably dogs, but also occurs in cats and horses. It can affect both the larger and the smaller joints of the body. In humans, this includes the hands, wrists, feet, back, hip, and knee. In dogs, this includes the elbow, hip, stifle (knee), shoulder, and back. The disease is essentially one acquired from daily wear and tear of the joint; however, osteoarthritis can also occur as a result of injury. Osteoarthritis begins in the cartilage and eventually causes the two opposing bones to erode into each other. The condition starts with minor pain during physical activity, but soon the pain can be continuous and even occur while in a state of rest. The pain can be debilitating and prevent one from doing some activities. In dogs, this pain can significantly affect quality of life and may include difficulty going up and down stairs, struggling to get up after lying down, trouble walking on slick floors, being unable to hop in and out of vehicles, difficulty jumping on and off furniture, and behavioral changes (e.g., aggression, difficulty squatting to toilet). Osteoarthritis typically affects the weight-bearing joints, such as the back, knee and hip. Unlike rheumatoid arthritis, osteoarthritis is most commonly a disease of the elderly. The strongest predictor of osteoarthritis is increased age, likely due to the declining ability of chondrocytes to maintain the structural integrity of cartilage. More than 30 percent of women have some degree of osteoarthritis by age 65. Other risk factors for osteoarthritis include prior joint trauma, obesity, and a sedentary lifestyle.

Rheumatoid arthritis

Rheumatoid arthritis (RA) is a disorder in which the body's own immune system starts to attack body tissues. The attack is not only directed at the joint but to many other parts of the body. In rheumatoid arthritis, most damage occurs to the joint lining and cartilage which eventually results in erosion of two opposing bones. RA often affects joints in the fingers, wrists, knees and elbows, is symmetrical (appears on both sides of the body), and can lead to severe deformity in a few years if not treated. RA occurs mostly in people aged 20 and above. In children, the disorder can present with a skin rash, fever, pain, disability, and limitations in daily activities. With earlier diagnosis and aggressive treatment, many individuals can lead a better quality of life than if going undiagnosed for long after RA's onset. The risk factors with the strongest association for developing rheumatoid arthritis are the female sex, a family history of rheumatoid arthritis, age, obesity, previous joint damage from an injury, and exposure to tobacco smoke.

Bone erosion is a central feature of rheumatoid arthritis. Bone continuously undergoes remodeling by actions of bone resorbing osteoclasts and bone forming osteoblasts. One of the main triggers of bone erosion in the joints in rheumatoid arthritis is inflammation of the synovium, caused in part by the production of pro-inflammatory cytokines and receptor activator of nuclear factor kappa B ligand (RANKL), a cell surface protein present in Th17 cells and osteoblasts. Osteoclast activity can be directly induced by osteoblasts through the RANK/RANKL mechanism.

Lupus

Lupus is a common collagen vascular disorder that can be present with severe arthritis. Other features of lupus include a skin rash, extreme photosensitivity, hair loss, kidney problems, lung fibrosis and constant joint pain.

Gout

Gout is caused by deposition of uric acid crystals in the joints, causing inflammation. There is also an uncommon form of gouty arthritis caused by the formation of rhomboid crystals of calcium pyrophosphate known as pseudogout. In the early stages, the gouty arthritis usually occurs in one joint, but with time, it can occur in many joints and be quite crippling. The joints in gout can often become swollen and lose function. Gouty arthritis can become particularly painful and potentially debilitating when gout cannot successfully be treated. When uric acid levels and gout symptoms cannot be controlled with standard gout medicines that decrease the production of uric acid (e.g., allopurinol) or increase uric acid elimination from the body through the kidneys (e.g., probenecid), this can be referred to as refractory chronic gout.

Comparison of types

Other
Infectious arthritis is another severe form of arthritis. It presents with sudden onset of chills, fever and joint pain. The condition is caused by bacteria elsewhere in the body. Infectious arthritis must be rapidly diagnosed and treated promptly to prevent irreversible joint damage.

Psoriasis can develop into psoriatic arthritis. With psoriatic arthritis, most individuals develop the skin problem first and then the arthritis. The typical features are continuous joint pains, stiffness and swelling. The disease does recur with periods of remission but there is no cure for the disorder. A small percentage develop a severely painful and destructive form of arthritis which destroys the small joints in the hands and can lead to permanent disability and loss of hand function.

Treatment
There is no known cure for arthritis and rheumatic diseases. Treatment options vary depending on the type of arthritis and include physical therapy, exercise and diet, orthopedic bracing, and oral and topical medications. Joint replacement surgery may be required to repair damage, restore function, or relieve pain.

Physical therapy
In general, studies have shown that physical exercise of the affected joint can noticeably improve long-term pain relief. Furthermore, exercise of the arthritic joint is encouraged to maintain the health of the particular joint and the overall body of the person.

Individuals with arthritis can benefit from both physical and occupational therapy. In arthritis the joints become stiff and the range of movement can be limited. Physical therapy has been shown to significantly improve function, decrease pain, and delay the need for surgical intervention in advanced cases. Exercise prescribed by a physical therapist has been shown to be more effective than medications in treating osteoarthritis of the knee. Exercise often focuses on improving muscle strength, endurance and flexibility. In some cases, exercises may be designed to train balance. Occupational therapy can provide assistance with activities. Assistive technology is a tool used to aid a person's disability by reducing their physical barriers by improving the use of their damaged body part, typically after an amputation. Assistive technology devices can be customized to the patient or bought commercially.

Medications
There are several types of medications that are used for the treatment of arthritis. Treatment typically begins with medications that have the fewest side effects with further medications being added if insufficiently effective.

Depending on the type of arthritis, the medications that are given may be different. For example, the first-line treatment for osteoarthritis is acetaminophen (paracetamol) while for inflammatory arthritis it involves non-steroidal anti-inflammatory drugs (NSAIDs) like ibuprofen. Opioids and NSAIDs may be less well tolerated. However, topical NSAIDs may have better safety profiles than oral NSAIDs. For more severe cases of osteoarthritis, intra-articular corticosteroid injections may also be considered.

The drugs to treat rheumatoid arthritis (RA) range from corticosteroids to monoclonal antibodies given intravenously. Due to the autoimmune nature of RA, treatments may include not only pain medications and anti-inflammatory drugs, but also another category of drugs called disease-modifying antirheumatic drugs (DMARDs). Treatment with DMARDs is designed to slow down the progression of RA by initiating an adaptive immune response, in part by CD4+ T helper (Th) cells, specifically Th17 cells. Th17 cells are present in higher quantities at the site of bone destruction in joints and produce inflammatory cytokines associated with inflammation, such as interleukin-17 (IL-17).

Surgery
A number of rheumasurgical interventions have been incorporated in the treatment of arthritis since the 1950s. Arthroscopic surgery for osteoarthritis of the knee provides no additional benefit to optimized physical and medical therapy.

Adaptive aids
People with hand arthritis can have trouble with simple activities of daily living tasks (ADLs), such as turning a key in a lock or opening jars, as these activities can be cumbersome and painful. There are adaptive aids or assistive devices (ADs) available to help with these tasks, but they are generally more costly than conventional products with the same function. It is now possible to 3-D print adaptive aids, which have been released as open source hardware to reduce patient costs. Adaptive aids can significantly help arthritis patients and the vast majority of those with arthritis need and use them.

Alternative medicine
Further research is required to determine if transcutaneous electrical nerve stimulation (TENS) for knee osteoarthritis is effective for controlling pain.

Low level laser therapy may be considered for relief of pain and stiffness associated with arthritis. Evidence of benefit is tentative.

Pulsed electromagnetic field therapy (PEMFT) has tentative evidence supporting improved functioning but no evidence of improved pain in osteoarthritis. The FDA has not approved PEMFT for the treatment of arthritis. In Canada, PEMF devices are legally licensed by Health Canada for the treatment of pain associated with arthritic conditions.

Epidemiology
Arthritis is predominantly a disease of the elderly, but children can also be affected by the disease. Arthritis is more common in women than men at all ages and affects all races, ethnic groups and cultures. In the United States a CDC survey based on data from 2013 to 2015 showed 54.4 million (22.7%) adults had self-reported doctor-diagnosed arthritis, and 23.7 million (43.5% of those with arthritis) had arthritis-attributable activity limitation (AAAL). With an aging population, this number is expected to increase. Adults with co-morbid conditions, such as heart disease, diabetes, and obesity, were seen to have a higher than average prevalence of doctor-diagnosed arthritis (49.3%, 47.1%, and 30.6% respectively).

Disability due to musculoskeletal disorders increased by 45% from 1990 to 2010. Of these, osteoarthritis is the fastest increasing major health condition. Among the many reports on the increased prevalence of musculoskeletal conditions, data from Africa are lacking and underestimated. A systematic review assessed the prevalence of arthritis in Africa and included twenty population-based and seven hospital-based studies. The majority of studies, twelve, were from South Africa. Nine studies were well-conducted, eleven studies were of moderate quality, and seven studies were conducted poorly. The results of the systematic review were as follows:
 Rheumatoid arthritis: 0.1% in Algeria (urban setting); 0.6% in Democratic Republic of Congo (urban setting); 2.5% and 0.07% in urban and rural settings in South Africa respectively; 0.3% in Egypt (rural setting), 0.4% in Lesotho (rural setting)
 Osteoarthritis: 55.1% in South Africa (urban setting); ranged from 29.5 to 82.7% in South Africans aged 65 years and older
 Knee osteoarthritis has the highest prevalence from all types of osteoarthritis, with 33.1% in rural South Africa
 Ankylosing spondylitis: 0.1% in South Africa (rural setting)
 Psoriatic arthritis: 4.4% in South Africa (urban setting)
 Gout: 0.7% in South Africa (urban setting)
 Juvenile idiopathic arthritis: 0.3% in Egypt (urban setting)

History
Evidence of osteoarthritis and potentially inflammatory arthritis has been discovered in dinosaurs. The first known traces of human arthritis date back as far as 4500 BC. In early reports, arthritis was frequently referred to as the most common ailment of prehistoric peoples. It was noted in skeletal remains of Native Americans found in Tennessee and parts of what is now Olathe, Kansas. Evidence of arthritis has been found throughout history, from Ötzi, a mummy found along the border of modern Italy and Austria, to the Egyptian mummies circa 2590 BC.

In 1715, William Musgrave published the second edition of his most important medical work, De arthritide symptomatica, which concerned arthritis and its effects. Augustin Jacob Landré-Beauvais, a 28-year-old resident physician at Salpêtrière Asylum in France was the first person to describe the symptoms of rheumatoid arthritis. Though Landré-Beauvais' classification of rheumatoid arthritis as a relative of gout was inaccurate, his dissertation encouraged others to further study the disease.

Terminology

The word arthritides is the plural form of arthritis, and denotes the collective group of arthritis-like conditions.

See also
 Antiarthritics
 Arthritis Care (charity in the UK)
 Arthritis Foundation (US not-for-profit)
 Knee arthritis
 Osteoimmunology
 Weather pains

References

External links 
 
 American College of Rheumatology – US professional society of rheumatologists
 National Institute of Arthritis and Musculoskeletal and Skin Diseases - US National Institute of Arthritis and Musculoskeletal and Skin Diseases

 
Aging-associated diseases
Inflammations
Rheumatology
Wikipedia neurology articles ready to translate
Skeletal disorders
Wikipedia medicine articles ready to translate